Bracken (Pteridium) is a genus of large, coarse ferns in the family Dennstaedtiaceae. Ferns (Pteridophyta) are vascular plants that have alternating generations, large plants that produce spores and small plants that produce sex cells (eggs and sperm). Brackens are noted for their large, highly divided leaves. They are found on all continents except Antarctica and in all environments except deserts, though their typical habitat is moorland. The genus probably has the widest distribution of any fern in the world.

The word bracken is of Old Norse origin, related to Swedish bräken and Danish bregne, both meaning fern.
In the past, the genus was commonly treated as having only one species, Pteridium aquilinum, but the recent trend is to subdivide it into about ten species.

Like other ferns, brackens do not have seeds or fruits, but the immature fronds, known as fiddleheads, are sometimes eaten, although some are thought to be carcinogenic.

Description and biology
Evolutionarily, bracken may be considered one of the most successful ferns. It is considered highly invasive, and can survive in acid soils.

Bracken, like heather, is typically found in moorland environments, and is commonly referred to by local populations in the north of England as 'Moorland Scrub'. It is also one of the oldest ferns, with fossil records over 55 million years old having been found. The plant sends up large, triangular fronds from a wide-creeping underground rootstock, and may form dense thickets. This rootstock may travel a metre or more underground between fronds. In cold environments, bracken is deciduous and, as it requires well-drained soil, is generally found growing on the sides of hills.

Fern spores are contained in structures found on the underside of the leaf called sori. The linear, leaf-edge pattern of these in bracken is different from that in most other ferns, where the sori are circular and occur towards the centre of the leaf.

Distribution
Pteridium aquilinum (bracken or common bracken) is the most common species with a cosmopolitan distribution, occurring in temperate and subtropical regions throughout much of the world. It is a prolific and abundant plant in the moorlands of Great Britain, where it is limited to altitudes of below 600 metres. It does not like poorly drained marshes or fen. It has been observed growing in soils from pH 2.8 to 8.6. Exposure to cold or high pH inhibits its growth. It causes such a problem in invading pasturelands that at one time the British government had an eradication programme. Special filters have even been used on some British water supplies to filter out the bracken spores.

Bracken is a characteristic moorland plant in the UK which over the last decades has increasingly out-competed characteristic ground-cover plants such as moor grasses, cowberry, bilberry, and heathers, and now covers a considerable part of upland moorland.
Once valued and gathered for use in animal bedding, tanning, soap and glass making, and as a fertiliser, bracken is now seen as a pernicious, invasive, and opportunistic plant, taking over from the plants traditionally associated with open moorland and reducing easy access by humans. It is toxic to cattle, dogs, sheep, pigs, and horses, and is also linked to cancers in humans. It can harbour high levels of sheep ticks, which can pass on Lyme disease. Grazing provided some control by stock trampling, but this has almost ceased since the 2007 foot-and-mouth disease outbreak reduced commercial livestock production. Global climatic changes have also suited bracken well and contributed to its rapid increase in land coverage.

Bracken is a well-adapted pioneer plant which can colonise land quickly, with the potential to extend its area by as much as 1–3% per year. This ability to expand rapidly at the expense of other plants and wildlife can cause major problems for land users and managers. It colonises ground with an open vegetation structure, but is slow to colonise healthy, well managed heather stands.

Bracken presents a threat to biodiversity. Many plant species occur only on upland moorland, tied to unique features in the habitat. The loss and degradation of such areas due to the dominance of bracken has caused many species to become rare and isolated.

Species

Fungal associations
Woodland fungi such as Mycena epipterygia can be found growing under the bracken canopy. Both Camarographium stephensii and Typhula quisquiliaris grow primarily from dead bracken stems.

Other plant associations

Bracken is known to produce and release allelopathic chemicals, which is an important factor in its ability to dominate other vegetation, particularly in regrowth after fire. Its chemical emissions, shady canopy, and thick litter inhibit other plant species from establishing themselves – with the occasional exception of plants which support rare butterflies. Herb and tree seedling growth may be inhibited even after bracken is removed, apparently because active plant toxins remain in the soil.

Bracken substitutes the characteristics of a woodland canopy, and is important for giving shade to European plants such as common bluebell and wood anemone where the woodland does not exist. These plants are intolerant to stock trampling. Dead bracken provides a warm microclimate for development of the immature stages. Climbing corydalis, wild gladiolus, and chickweed wintergreen also seem to benefit from the conditions found under bracken stands.

The high humidity in the stands helps mosses survive underneath, including Campylopus flexuosus, Hypnum cupressiforme, Polytrichum commune, Pseudoscelopodium purum and Rhytidiadelphus squarrosus.

Uses

Food 

Bracken fiddleheads have been eaten by many cultures throughout history, either fresh, cooked, or pickled. Pteridium aquilinum is especially common in East Asian cuisine.

In Korea, bracken (sometimes referred to as 'fernbrake' in Korean recipes) is known as gosari (고사리), and is a typical ingredient in bibimbap, a popular mixed rice dish. Stir-fried bracken (gosari namul) is also a common side dish (banchan) in Korea.

In Japan, bracken is known as warabi (わらび), and is steamed, boiled, or cooked in soups. Warabimochi bracken jelly, named after its resemblance to mochi rice cakes, is a popular traditional dessert, although commercial variants are often made with cheaper potato starch instead.  The fiddleheads are also preserved in salt, sake, or miso.

In China, bracken is known as juecai (蕨菜), and is eaten like vegetables or preserved by drying. Also called "fernbrake", it is used as a vegetable in soups and stews.

Bracken rhizomes can be ground into flour to make bread. In the Canary Islands, the rhizome was historically used to make a porridge called gofio. Both fronds and rhizomes have been used to produce beer in Siberia, and among indigenous peoples of North America.

Bracken leaves are used in the Mediterranean region to filter sheep's milk, and to store freshly made ricotta cheese.

P. esculentum rhizomes were traditionally used by the Māori people of New Zealand as a staple food, and are known as aruhe. They were eaten by exploring or hunting groups away from permanent settlements. The plant was widely distributed across New Zealand as a result of prehistoric deforestation, and planting on rich soils, which produced the best rhizomes. The rhizomes were dried, and could be heated and softened with a pounder (patu aruhe), after which the starch could be sucked from the fibers. Patu aruhe were important ritual items, and several distinct styles were developed.

Source of potash 
Green bracken ferns average 25 percent potash and can contain as much as 55 percent. It possesses advantages over other sources of plant ash such as hardwood due to its high potash yield as a percentage of both dry and fresh mass, abundance, growth rate, and ease of harvesting. Bracken has been recognized as a source of potash since at least the 10th century AD, with numerous references in European texts, typically in relation to its use for soap and glass making. The turn to mined sources of potash in the industrial age ended significant usage of bracken as a source of potash, contributing to its status as a troublesome weed.

Others 
Bracken has traditionally been used for animal bedding, which later breaks down into a rich mulch that could be used as fertilizer. It is still used this way in Wales. It is also used as a winter mulch, which has been shown to reduce the loss of potassium and nitrogen in the soil, and to lower soil pH.

Toxicity
Bracken contains the carcinogenic compound ptaquiloside, which causes damage to DNA, thus leading to cancers of the digestive tract. High stomach cancer rates are found in Japan and North Wales, where bracken is often eaten, but it is unclear whether bracken plays a role. Consumption of ptaquiloside-contaminated milk is thought to contribute to human gastric cancer in the Andean states of Venezuela. The spores have also been implicated as carcinogens.

However, ptaquiloside is water-soluble and destroyed in heat (by cooking) and alkaline conditions (by soaking). Korean and Japanese cooks have traditionally soaked the shoots in water and ash to detoxify the plant before eating. Ptaquiloside also degenerates at room temperature, and denatures almost completely at boiling temperature. Despite this, moderation of consumption is still recommended to reduce chances of cancer formation. The British Royal Horticultural Society recommends against consumption of bracken altogether, by both humans and livestock.

Ptaquiloside has been shown to leach from wild bracken plants into the water supply, which has been implicated in high rates of stomach and oesophageal cancers in areas with high bracken growth, such as Wales and South America.

Uncooked bracken also contains the enzyme thiaminase, which breaks down thiamine (vitamin B1). Excessive consumption of bracken can lead to vitamin B1 deficiency (beriberi), especially in animals with simple stomachs. Ruminants are less vulnerable because they synthesize thiamine.

In animals 
Ptaquiloside from bracken has been shown to be carcinogenic in some animals. Animals may ingest the plant when other sources of food are unavailable, such as during droughts or after snowfalls.

In cattle, bracken poisoning can occur in acute and chronic forms, acute poisoning being the most common. Milk from cows that have eaten bracken may also contain ptaquiloside, which is especially concentrated in buttermilk. In pigs and horses, bracken poisoning induces vitamin B1 deficiency.

In insects 
Hydrogen cyanide is released by the young fronds of bracken when eaten by mammals or insects. Two major insect moulting hormones, alpha ecdysone and 20-hydroxyecdysone, are found in bracken. These cause uncontrollable, repeated moulting in insects ingesting the fronds, leading to rapid death. Bracken is currently under investigation as a possible source of new insecticides.

Archaeology

Many sites have archaeological remains dating from the Neolithic and Bronze Ages through to the Industrial Revolution. The root systems of established bracken stands degrade archaeological sites by disrupting the strata and other physical evidence. These rhizomes may travel a metre or more underground between fronds and form 90% of the plant, with only the remainder being visible.

Control
Some small level of scattered cover can provide beneficial habitats for some wildlife, at least in the UK (as given above). However, on balance, removing bracken encourages primary habitats to re-establish, which are of greater importance for wildlife. Control is a complex question with complex answers, which need to form part of a wider approach. Management can be difficult and expensive; plans may need to be about cost-effective, practical limitation and control rather than give an expectation for eradication.

All methods need follow-up over time, starting with the advancing areas first. Given the decades elapsed to arrive at the current levels of coverage on many sites, slowing or reversing the process will be also of necessity long-term, with consistency and persistence from all parties being key.

Various techniques are recommended by Natural England and the RSPB to control bracken either individually or in combination RSPB Bracken management in the uplands.
 Cutting — Once or twice a year, repeatedly cutting back the fronds for at least 3 years.
 Crushing/rolling —  Using rollers, again for at least 3 years.
 Livestock treading — During winter, encouraging livestock to bracken areas with food. They trample the developing plants and allow frost to penetrate the rhizomes. In May and June, temporary close grazing or mob stocking on small areas away from nests, particularly using cattle, horses, pigs, or ponies may crush emerging bracken fronds resulting in reduced bracken cover. Sufficient fodder will be required to prevent livestock eating the bracken. This may suit steep areas where human access is difficult and herbicide undesirable.
 Herbicide — Asulam (also known as Asulox) is selective for ferns; glyphosate is not; but the latter has the advantage that the effects can be seen soon after application. They are applied when the fronds are fully unfurled to ensure that the chemical is fully absorbed. Rare ferns such as adder's tongue (Ophioglossum vulgatum), killarney (Trichomanes speciosum) and lemon-scented ferns can also be found in similar habitats and it is important that these are not destroyed in the process of bracken control.
Natural England recommends that only Asulam can be sprayed aerially, Glyphosate requires spot treatment, e.g. using a weedwiper or knapsack spray. The toxicity of Asulam is low and has been generally highly cost-effective but its use is now restricted by the EU after 2012, at least until specific registered uses can be defined.

Selective sprays like Starane, Access, Metsulfuron 600WG, etc. work well but only if sprayed in late autumn so the rhizomes store food for winter and hence absorb the poison.

On archaeological sites, chemical control is usually required as mechanical methods may cause damage.
 Allowing plants to grow in its place, e.g., the establishment of woodland, causes shade that inhibits bracken growth. In the UK, trees, notably rowan, have done well since grazing reduced greatly after the foot-and-mouth epidemic in 2000 but young saplings struggle in high bracken. In decades to come and if permitted, tree shade cover may increase and so may reduce bracken growth, but this is both long-term and in some cases is contentious in the change it would bring to traditionally open heath or moorland, both aesthetically and as a valuable habitat.
 Burning — Useful for removing the litter, but may be counter-productive as bracken is considered to be a fire-adapted species.
 Ploughing — Late in the season followed by sowing seed.

Any bracken control programme must be completed, or bracken will re-establish.

A Bracken Control Group was established in 2012 to provide best-practice guidance for all bracken control techniques. The Group has also been responsible for submitting an application for an Emergency Authorisation to secure the continued availability of Asulam for bracken control, following the decision not to register the product under new regulations in the EU. Registration has been re-applied for but this will not be available until 2017 at the earliest. Until re-registration is approved the Group will aim to keep Asulam available under the emergency provisions.  Bracken Control Group website

See also
 List of plants poisonous to equines

References 

 
 Germplasm Resources Information Network: Pteridium aquilinum
 Flora Europaea: Pteridium aquilinum
 Flora of North America: Pteridium aquilinum

External links 

 World fern species list — Pteridium
 Independent page devoted to bracken (uses older classification scheme)
 
 Natural England — Bracken control, vegetation restoration and land management
 RSPB: Bracken management in the uplands
 Bracken for Butterflies by Butterfly Conservation
 Edibility of Bracken: Identification and edible parts of bracken

Dennstaedtiaceae
Japanese vegetables
IARC Group 2B carcinogens